{{Infobox beauty pageant
| photo = 
| date =  Dec. 7th, 2008
| venue = Puerto Princesa City, Palawan
| entrants = 23
| placements = 10
| presenters = 
| broadcaster = TV5 
| winner  = Jonavi Raisa QuirayPalawan
| congeniality = Queency BernalezSouthern Leyte
| photogenic = Loren Andre BurgosCalifornia| before = 2007
| next = 2009
|}}Mutya ng Pilipinas 2008''', the 40th edition of Mutya ng Pilipinas, Inc., was held on Dec. 7th, 2008 in Puerto Princesa City, Palawan. Jonavi Raisa Quiray, the winner of Mutya ng Pilipinas International 2008 and Jam Charish Libatog named as Mutya ng Pilipinas Tourism Puerto Princesa 2008.

Results
Color keys

Special Titles

Special Awards

Contestants

Withdrawals

Crossovers from Major National Pageants prior to this date
 Mutya #1 Katrina Grace Rigets was Miss Philippines Earth 2006 Miss Water / 2nd runner-up

Post-Pageant Notes

 Mutya ng Pilipinas International (Intercontinental), Jonavi Raisa Quiray was unable to compete at Miss Intercontinental 2008 pageant but was sent the following year at the Miss Tourism International 2009 pageant in Kuala Lumpur, Malaysia but was unplaced
 Mutya ng Pilipinas Tourism, Jam Charish Libatog competed at Miss Tourism International 2008 in Kuala Lumpur, Malaysia and placed in Top 15

References

External links
 Official Mutya ng Pilipinas website
  Mutya ng Pilipinas 2009 is on!

2008
2008 beauty pageants
2008 in the Philippines